Point system : 30, 24, 20, 16, 12, 10, 8, 6, 4, 2 for 10th. In each race 2 point for Fastest lap and 2 for Pole position.
Races : 2 or 3 races by rounds length of 30 minutes each.

2005 Formula Renault 2.0 Italia Winter Series
Point system : 20, 15, 12, 10, 8, 6, 4, 3, 2, 1 for 10th.

References

Formula Renault seasons